Trevor Anderson (born 3 March 1951) is a Northern Irish former footballer and manager. He played as a forward.

Playing career
Born in Belfast, Anderson began his playing career at Portadown before signing for Manchester United in October 1972. After only appearing in 19 League games for the club he moved to Swindon Town and made his début on 5 November 1974. He scored the only goal in this game, a 1–0 win against Chesterfield. He was the club's top scorer for the 1975–76 season with 15 goals.

He moved to Peterborough in December 1977 before returning to Northern Ireland to play for Linfield.

A Northern Ireland international, he made his début against Cyprus in 1973 and went on to achieve 22 caps, 12 whilst a Swindon player.

Management career
Anderson managed Linfield from 1992 to 1997, winning a number of honours including two Irish Football League titles and two Irish Cups. Anderson left the club in 1997 to take up the post as Director of Football at Newry Town. The club were a division below Linfield but had a reputation for spending big money, by Irish League standards, and the club won promotion under Anderson's direction. He subsequently managed Ards, leading the club to promotion in 2001. He went on to manage Dundalk.

Honours

Club
Linfield
Irish League (6): 1979–80, 1981–82, 1982–83, 1983–84, 1984–85, 1985–86
Irish Cup (2): 1980–81, 1981–82
Gold Cup (4): 1979–80, 1981–82, 1983–84, 1984–85
Ulster Cup (2): 1979–80, 1984–85
Co. Antrim Shield (4): 1980–81, 1981–82, 1982–83, 1983–84
Tyler All-Ireland Cup (1): 1980–81

Individual
Northern Ireland Football Writers' Player of the Year: 1986

References

External links
Swindon Town player profile
Northern Ireland's footballing greats profile

1951 births
Living people
Dundalk F.C. managers
Association football forwards
NIFL Premiership players
Linfield F.C. players
Manchester United F.C. players
Association footballers from Northern Ireland
Northern Ireland international footballers
Association footballers from Belfast
Peterborough United F.C. players
Portadown F.C. players
Swindon Town F.C. players
English Football League players
Ulster Scots people
Linfield F.C. managers
Northern Ireland Football Writers' Association Players of the Year
Northern Ireland amateur international footballers
Football managers from Northern Ireland